Underground to Palestine is a 1946 book by American journalist I. F. Stone chronicling some of the hundreds of thousands of Holocaust survivors attempting to reach the Jewish homeland in Mandatory Palestine from post-WWII displaced persons camps.

Stone travels with the Haganah to Europe, where he joins a group of displaced persons (DPs) as they travel across the continent seeking a clandestine port of embarcation, joins an illegal convoy, runs the  British blockade, and lands illegally in Mandatory Palestine.

Stone wrote that displaced persons made strenuous efforts to reach the Jewish homeland of Israel although it would have been far easier to emigrate to the United States because 

Writing in The Globe and Mail, journalist John R. MacArthur judges the book better than John Reed's   Ten Days that Shook the World.

Publishing history

The book first appeared as a series of articles published in PM, which won the Newspaper Guild of New York,   Page One award in 1947.

In 1978 the book was reprinted with the title Underground to Palestine and Reflections Thirty Years Later. It contained two extra chapters (Confessions of a Jewish Dissident and The Other Zionism) both of which had originally appeared as articles published in the New York Review of Books. Underground to Palestine at one point went out of print, possibly because of Stone's unpopular position favoring a binational Palestine.

References

1946 non-fiction books
20th-century history books
Aliyah Bet
Books about refugees
Ashkenazi Jews topics
History books about Israel
History books about Jews and Judaism